Ferenc Révay de Szklabina et Blatnicza,  (1489 – 1 November 1553, Pozsony (today Bratislava, Slovakia)) was the Palatinal Governor in the Kingdom of Hungary, thus was ranking third to the Kings Number.

Biography 
Révay was the son of László Révay and Anna Eszteleky. Ferenc Révay became the personal secretary of Stephen Báthory in 1521. After the Battle of Mohács in 1526, during the dispute over the throne, he joined Ferdinand I of the Habsburgs. Following the call of his brother, István Révay, and Jovan Nenad joined Ferdinand, Ferdinand seized the throne, Ferenc Révay was elected as Royal Tablemaster, and as a royal donation, he received half of the Szklabina fortress, which he took full control of in 1540.

In 1532, Révay became the Ispán (Count; comes) of Turóc County (Turiec region in today's Slovakia). He was then granted the rank of Chief Justice and received numerous donations. He became Palatinal Governor in 1542. He was present in the Parliament of 1550, where he was elected as the member of the Border-Check Committee.

Révay favoured science and scientists. He regularly communicated with András Gyulai and András Choron. He was an admirer of Martin Luther, and they exchanged several letters.

Sources 

1489 births
1553 deaths
Hungarian nobility
Chief justices of Hungary
Ferenc